Dukuhjati Wetan (abbreviated as "Dujawe") is one of the villages located in the district of Kedungbateng, Tegal, Central Java, Indonesia.

History 
Among the stories that describe the beginning of the name of Dukuhjati Wetan, perhaps this version is fitting to tell the beginning of the name of Dukuhjati Wetan. The founder of this village is Mbah Kadiman, he came from Paketiban Village who then migrated to this region. Dukuhjati Wetan was once an unnamed hamlet and has a population of about 600 people. It is said that this area there is a giant golden tree that sometimes appears at night and not everyone can see it, people here call it by name "Golden Teak Tree" which supposedly located in the middle of kedung, "kedung" here is part of the river which is deeper than other parts because there is a basin in the bottom of the river. Previously this area will be combined with Kedungbanteng Village, but the people here refuse and want to stand on their own. From there Mbah Kadiman formed this region into a village and gave it the name as Kedungjati Village, but the name of that village is not used because there is another village that has used it first. In the end, it was replaced by the name of the village of Dukuhjati Wetan which may be more fitting with the condition of its territory, namely "hamlet" which has "giant teak" and geographical location of its territory located in "wetan" (=east) river which containing the kedung.

Geography 
Dukuhjati Wetan is one of the villages located in the western part of Kedungbanteng, Tegal with geographical location 6° 57' 59" S and 109° 11' 40.9" E. The western part of the village of Dukuhjati Wetan is lowland and there is a residential area. While the east is the rice fields, plantations and hills. On the border of Rancawiru Village, in the west there is a river that flows named Cacaban River which hails in Cacaban Lake and also as a dividing boundary between these two villages, in the middle of this village there is also Windusari River which serves as an irrigation inspection channel.

Boundaries 
The boundaries of the village of Dukuhjati Wetan are as follows:

Population

Population spread 
The population distribution of this village is uneven, almost the entire population is settled to the west of Dukuhjati Wetan Village.

Administrative division 
The village is divided into 8 Rukun Warga (RW) and 16 Rukun Tetangga (RT).

Economy 
Most of the people's livelihoods are working in agriculture and plantation sectors and some others are traders, construction project workers, teachers and the workers working out of town

Division of Dukuhjati Wetan Village 
Settlement area
 Dukuhjati Wetan
 Rawa Koneng (Hamlet in Dukuhjati Wetan Village)
 Rema (Hamlet in Dukuhjati Wetan Village)
Paddy fields area
 Contoh
 Dlanggung Gunung
 Gedegan
 Gersayim
 Kalidosari Kidul 
 Kalidosari Lor
 Kesang
 Kronjo
 Legok
 Lobang
 Strem Kidul
 Strem Lor
 Tipar
Hill terrain
 Geger Wedi Hill (in the southeast)

Education 
Formal
 An Nur Play Group (Jl. Gatot Kaca RT 10/05) 
 Masyithoh Kindergarten (Jl. Werkudara RT 07/04) 
 Falakhuddin Islamic Kindergarten (Jl. Raya Simpang Tiga Utara RT 02/01)
 Dukuhjati Wetan 01 Elementary School (Jl. Raya Simpang Tiga RT 01/01)
 Dukuhjati Wetan 02 Elementary School (Jl. Raya Simpang Tiga RT 01/01)
Non formal
 MDTA Miftahul Ulum (Jl. Werkudara RT 07/04)
 Al Khudhoriyyah EPQ (Jl. Gatot Kaca RT 13/07)
 Muslimat NU EPQ (Jl. Werkudara RT 07/04)
 An Nur EPQ (Jl. Gatot Kaca RT 10/05)

 P.S. EPQ (Education Park of the Qur'an)

See also 
 Dukuhjati Wetan Village in Indonesian Wikipedia

References 

Villages in Central Java